The Metropolitan Museum of Art has in its collection a 1st-century rhyton terminating in the forepart of a wild cat. The silver drinking vessel, which depicts a wild cat, is attributed to the Parthian Empire.

Description 
The rhyton exhibits several hallmarks of Hellenistic art, which were introduced to Iran during the conquests of Alexander the Great. These symbols include dancing women, grapevines, and a panther, all of which are strongly associated with wine-centric Dionysian cults. The Metropolitan Museum of Art describes the work as "a fine example of the enduring influence of Hellenistic culture."

References 

Metalwork of the Metropolitan Museum of Art
Hellenistic art
Parthian art
Persian art
Ancient art in metal